Md. Zahirul Haque who is best known by his stage name as Zayed Khan (Z.K), is a Bangladeshi film actor who has appeared in more than 25 films to date. He started his career in 2006 with the film Bhalobasha Bhalobasha. Since then he has appeared in the films  Nagar Mastan opposite Pori Moni and Dabangg. He was cast in Antor Jala (2017) due to director Malek Afsary's preference for him as an actor. He is the general secretary of Bangladesh Film Artists' Association, the organisation of local film artists. Early life and education
Zayed Khan was born on July 30, 1984 in Pirojpur, Bangladesh.
His father name is M. A. Hoque and mother name is Shahida Hoque who died on December 27, 2021, one year after death of his father. She was rewarded as 'Ratnagurba'.

Education
Zayed Khan studied from Dhaka City College. He used to live with his sister behind the Modhumita Cinema Hall, Dhaka. After passing the Higher Secondary examination he attended Dhaka University.

Career
Film
Zayed began his career in the 2006 film Bhalobasha Bhalobasha opposite Riaz and Shabnur, later appearing in another movie Mon Chuyeche Mon with them. He acted in Jomidar Barir Meye opposite Amin Khan and Nipun, also starring in Rickshawalar Chele alongside Dipjol. He has also appeared in Prem Korbo Tomar Sathe and Toke Bhalobastei Hobe.

Bangladesh Film Artists' Association

In May 2017, Khan became the general secretary of Bangladesh Film Artists' Association. He bagged 279 votes while his opponent, Amit Hasan, got 145 votes.

On 28 January 2022, Khan once again became the general secretary of Bangladesh Film Artists' Association after bagging 176 votes while his competitor, Nipun Akter, got 163 votes. Later, as the allegations of buying votes in exchange for money were proven, the appeal board canceled the candidature of Zayed Khan and declared Nipun Akter the winner.

Politics
He is a member of Awami League and central cultural sub-committee member of the party.

Filmography 

 Television 
 Tobuo Protikkha''

References

External links

Bangladeshi male film actors
Living people
1984 births